Who Says God Is Dead! is the eleventh solo studio album and second Gospel album by American country music singer-songwriter Loretta Lynn. It was released on January 29, 1968, by Decca Records.

Critical reception

In the issue dated February 17, 1968, Billboard published a review of the album, saying, "The darling of the country music field has produced another beautiful religious LP. Her understanding and perception on "Who Says God Is Dead" is convincing. She's also great on "I Believe", "In the Garden", and "The Old Rugged Cross"."

Cashbox published a review in the February 10, 1968 issue that said, "Consistently riding high as country's champion gal disk seller, Loretta Lynn offers another collection of inspirational tunes done up with her inimitable styling. Country 'soul' is the keynote in this set as Loretta combines hymn-like spirituals ("I Believe") with rousing gospel numbers ("He’s Got the Whole World in His Hands"), all of which adds up to one heck of a catalog piece. No doubt about the saleability of this one."

Commercial performance 
There were no singles released from the album, so initial sales of the album were low. The album peaked at No. 44 on the US Billboard Hot Country LPs chart, Lynn's lowest position on the chart until the mid-1980s.

Recording
Recording sessions for the album began on June 28, 1967, at Bradley's Barn in Mount Juliet, Tennessee. Two additional sessions followed on December 18 and 19.

Track listing

Personnel
Adapted from the album liner notes and Decca recording session records.
The Anita Kerr Singers – background vocals
Owen Bradley – producer
Floyd Cramer – piano
Larry Estes – drums
Lloyd Green – steel guitar
Junior Huskey – bass
The Jordanaires – background vocals
Ernest Ray Lynn – duet vocals on "Mama, Why?"
Loretta Lynn – lead vocals
Grady Martin – lead electric guitar
Billy Sanford – guitar
Jerry Stembridge – guitar

Charts

References 

1968 albums
Loretta Lynn albums
Albums produced by Owen Bradley
Decca Records albums
Gospel albums by American artists